Kanaima may refer to:
 Kanaima (froghopper), a genus of insects
 Kanaima, sorcerers in Wapishana beliefs